Block 13 is a Kuwaiti animated television series that serves as the Arabic adaptation of the popular American animated sitcom, South Park. It was created and directed by Nawaf Salem Al-Shammari and aired on Kuwait TV in November 27th, 2000, running until December 5th, 2002. It was the first animated TV series to be produced in the Persian Gulf region.

The series follows Hammoud, Azzouz, Saloom, Honey, Abboud,  and his baby sister Farooha, who all often go on wacky and strange misadventures. Similar to South Park in the United States, the series dealt with many issues that concerned the Kuwaiti population but in a way that could be less offensive and more family-friendly. Unlike South Park, which is adult-oriented, Block 13 was meant for families and children of all ages.

Credits

Directors & Creators 
Nawaf Salem Al-Shammari (director, creator, writer)

Mohammed Maseeb Najm (writer, assistant director)

Designers

Animators
Sami Al-Khars

Khalid Al-Lahw

Graphic Design
Nayef Al-Feili (S1-3)

Atef Al-Azmi and Ali Bin Awadh (S2)

Meshari Al-Arouj

Fahad Hayat (S3)

Sound

Composers, Writers and Sound Effects
Ahmed Al-Shargawi (opening theme writer)

Sahir (ending theme writer)

Ammar Al-Binni & Komar (block 13 theme composer, and sound effects)

Sound Editing & Mixing
Salman Al-Zeidi (S2)

Khalid Al-Ajlan (S2-3)

Sound Recording
Abdullah Al-Ali and Fahad Zakour (S2)

Hani Al-Nasser (S3)

Other

Financial Supervisor
Ali Nasir

Computer Engineering
Dhari Shamali

Saleh Al-Harbi

Khalid Al-Eid (S1)

Moustafa Al-Ameer (S2)

Mohammed Al-Middhin (S3)

Editor
Ahmed Al-Khaldi (S1-2)

Handlettering
Abdul-Ameer Al-Bannai (S2)

Coordination
Hassan Al-Shatti (S1)

Mohammed Al-Bakshi (S2)

History

South Park ban
After South Park was banned in Kuwait due to its poking fun at Islam, Block 13 was created to serve as a replacement for South Park in the region. The show aired during every year's Ramadan.

Spin-offs

Qatouta and Kaloob
Due to the show's success, after the show ended because it was too dark for children, a spin-off titled Qatouta and Kaloob (Arabic: قطوطة وكلوب, romanized: qatutat wakulub) was released during the Ramadan of 2004 and aired on Al-Rai TV, made by the same people who worked on Block 13, and directed by Nawaf Salem Al-Shammari.
The show stars Qatouta, a female purple cat along with Kaloob, Honey's pet dog. Qatouta is voiced by the same voice actor as Faroouha from Block 13.

Eyal Al-Freej and Fawq Tahat - UTURN
Qatouta and Kaloob wouldn't be the last animated project to be directed by Al-Shammari, as Eyal Al-Freej would be made and aired on Qatar's Alkass Sports Channels in 2006, making it Al-Shammari's recent animated project to date. Sami Al-Khars, who worked on Qatouta and Kaloob and Block 13 wasn't involved in the making of Eyal Al-Freej, instead, character designer Mohammed Abdul-Latif stepped in to design the characters. Abdul-Latif previously worked with Al-Shammari on the animated segments from "Fawq Tahat - UTURN" in 2003.

References

External links

Block 13's official website (archived)

Television series about Islam
Islamic animated films
Kuwaiti television series
Arabic television series
Arabic-language television shows
2000 television series debuts
2000s animated television series
2003 television series endings
Television shows remade overseas
Television remakes
South Park